Möckern-Loburg-Fläming (until July 2007: "Möckern-Fläming") is a former Verwaltungsgemeinschaft ("collective municipality") in the Jerichower Land district, in Saxony-Anhalt, Germany. It is situated approximately 30 km east of Magdeburg. The seat of the Verwaltungsgemeinschaft was in Möckern. It was disbanded on 1 July 2012, when Schopsdorf joined the town of Genthin.

Subdivision
The Verwaltungsgemeinschaft Möckern-Loburg-Fläming consisted of the following municipalities:

 Möckern 
 Schopsdorf

External links
 Verwaltungsgemeinschaft Möckern-Fläming

Former Verwaltungsgemeinschaften in Saxony-Anhalt